Sofia Anna Czarnkowska (also called Zofia Czarnkowska Opalińska or Catherine-Sophie-Anne Czarnkowska) (12 March 1660 – 2 December 1701) was a Polish noblewoman, known as the maternal grandmother of the queen of France, Marie Leszczyńska.

Life
She was the daughter of Adam Uriel Czarnkowski and Theresa Zaleska. She married Jan Karol Opaliński on December 4, 1678. They had the children Maria (August 1679 – October 1679), Catherine (Katarzyna) Opalińska, Queen of Poland (1680–1743), a stillborn child (1681), and Stanislas (1682–1682).  She became the grandmother of Marie Leszczyńska (who would be Queen Consort of France, married to Louis XV of France) and Anna Leszczyńska.

She died on 8 December 1701 from pneumonia aged 41, at Breslau (today Wrocław).

Legacy
A monument was erected in 1748 in the church of Sieraków. The crypt in a nearby castle contains the sarcophagus of the Opaliński family.

Among her matrilineal descendants is the King Juan Carlos I of Spain, who is her descendant through an unbroken line of Bourbon princesses from Marie Leszczyńska of France, who married within the Bourbon house.

See also
 Opaliński family

References 

1660 births
1701 deaths
Opaliński family
17th-century Polish people
17th-century Polish women